Amy Simon is an American planetary scientist at NASA's Goddard Space Flight Center, involved in several missions of the Solar System Exploration Program.

Education 
Simon is from Union Township, Union County, New Jersey, where she attended Union High School. She earned a bachelor's degree in Space Sciences from Florida Institute of Technology in 1993  and was inducted into Sigma Pi Sigma. She completed her doctoral studies in astronomy at the New Mexico State University in 1998. Upon graduation she became a postdoctoral research scientist at Cornell University.

Career 
Simon is a Senior Scientist in the Solar System Exploration Division at NASA's Goddard Space Flight Center, having joined NASA as a civil servant in 2001. She served as the Chief of the Planetary Systems Laboratory from 2008 to 2010 and the Associate Division Director from 2010 to 2013.

Her scientific research involves the study of the composition, dynamics, and cloud structure in jovian planet atmospheres, primarily from spacecraft observations, and as of 2018 she has authored more than 100 peer-reviewed publications.

Works 
Her contributions include the first detailed study of the changing shape of Jupiter's Great Red Spot, as well as the discoveries of several types of waves in the atmosphere of Jupiter. Her analysis of Voyager 2, Cassini-Huygens, Hubble Space Telescope and New Horizons images led to the discovery of several new classes of Jupiter atmospheric waves.

Beyond Jupiter, she has studied atmospheric chemistry and dynamics on Saturn, including the north polar hexagon. She was also part of a team that observed Neptune using the Kepler space telescope, detecting solar oscillations in light reflected off a planet for the first time.

Simon is  involved in multiple robotic NASA planetary missions. She was a co-investigator on the Cassini-Huygens Composite Infrared Spectrometer (CIRS) and is the deputy instrument scientist for the OSIRIS-REx Visible and IR Spectrometer (OVIRS), as well as for the Landsat 9 Thermal Infrared Sensor-2  instrument and the deputy principal investigator for the Lucy spacecraft L'Ralph instrument.

She is principal investigator of the Hubble Outer Planet Atmospheres Legacy (OPAL) program. Her team discovered a new Great Dark Spot on Neptune with Hubble and have published more than 12 manuscripts from OPAL data. Her work with OSIRIS-REX led to the discovery of hydrated minerals on the surface of Bennu and earned a NASA Exceptional Scientific Achievement Medal.

Explorations 
Simon also plans future planetary exploration missions. She served on the National Academy of Sciences' Space Studies Board 2013 Planetary Science Decadal Survey. She has co-led several mission studies for NASA including Flagship class missions to Enceladus and to the Ice Giants, Uranus and Neptune. She was principal investigator for the proposed New Frontiers class Saturn probe mission, SPRITE.

Simon is a member of the American Geophysical Union, the American Astronomical Society, and the Division for Planetary Sciences.

Honors and awards 
 Meritorious Senior Professional Presidential Rank Awards - 2022 
 NASA Outstanding Leadership Medal – 2020 
 John C. Lindsay Memorial Award for Space Science - 2020 
 NASA Exceptional Scientific Achievement Medal – 2019 
 NASA Silver Achievement Medal (OVIRS Team) – 2017
 NASA Group Achievement Award (OSIRIS-REx Team) – 2017
 Robert H. Goddard Science Achievement Award (Hubble OPAL Team) – 2016
 Robert H. Goddard Engineering Achievement Award (OVIRS Team)
 NASA Exceptional Service Medal – 2016 
 Robert H. Goddard Exceptional Engineering (OVIRS Team) – 2014
 NASA Exceptional Service Medal – 2014 
 Asteroid 84994 Amysimon, discovered by the Catalina Sky Survey in 2003, was named in her honor. The official  was published by the Minor Planet Center on 14 May 2014.

References 

Date of birth missing (living people)
Living people
Planetary scientists
Florida Institute of Technology alumni
New Mexico State University alumni
People from Union Township, Union County, New Jersey
Union High School (New Jersey) alumni
American women scientists
Women planetary scientists
Year of birth missing (living people)
21st-century American women